Typhoon Percy, known in the Philippines as Typhoon Klaring, was the third tropical cyclone to affect the country in 1990. The fourth and the last tropical cyclone to be formed in June of the 1990 Pacific typhoon season, Typhoon Percy originated from an area of disturbed weather spawned by the Western Pacific monsoon trough on June 20. That same day, the disturbance was classified as a tropical depression as it slowly organized and on June 21, the depression obtained tropical storm intensity. After initially tracking westward, Percy turned towards the southwest while slowly deepening. During this time, Percy affected several of the Carolina Islands. Thirty homes were damaged and airline services were halted in and out of Yap. Farther south-southwest, seven homes were destroyed on the Ngulu Atoll. Furthermore, one boy was killed on Koror, where numerous homes lost their roofs and communication lines were downed. Percy then turned back to the west-northwest and became a typhoon on June 23. Two days later, on June 27, increased wind shear began to induce a weakening trend and the typhoon brushed Luzon, where eight people were killed and over 30,000 lost their homes. Despite that however, damages in the country was minor.

After tracking through the South China Sea, Percy made landfall southwest of Xiamen on June 29, and on the next day, dissipated inland. In the province of Quanzhou, four people were killed while 100,000 trees were damaged along with 1,000 power lines. One person was killed in Zhangzhou. In Dongshan, one individual died, four others suffered injuries, and a third of the trees were downed. Moreover, in the province of Shantou, 95 structures were destroyed and 201 were damaged. A total of 16 people were killed throughout southeastern China and more than 100 others sustained injuries. Damage was estimated at US$28 million (¥190 million).

Meteorological history

Typhoon Percy originated from the eastern end of the Western Pacific monsoon trough that spawned an area of disturbed weather that was first noted by the Joint Typhoon Warning Center (JTWC) on the morning of June 20. Satellite imagery showed signs of a well-defined low-level circulation and the disturbance was situated in a weakly divergent environment aloft along with persistent convection. On the same day, the Japan Meteorological Agency (JMA) upgraded the system into a tropical depression. The system gradually became more organized as its outflow expanded, and following a marked increase in convection, the JTWC issued a Tropical Cyclone Formation Alert on the system at 03:00 UTC on June 21. Following a ship report of  winds, both the JTWC and JMA upgraded the system into Tropical Storm Percy. After initially tracking westward, Percy turned and tracked southwestward for 36 hours, a move predicted by tropical cyclone forecast models but not foreseen by the JTWC. Meanwhile, the storm slowly intensified, aided by the development of an anticyclone caused aloft. As Percy continued to intensify, Percy began to track west-northwestward around another upper-level anticyclone that was formed in the southeast of Typhoon Ofelia which would later merge with a subtropical ridge to its north. By June 22, Percy was upgraded into a severe tropical storm by the JMA. Following the development of an outflow channel to its south, hints of an eye became visible on satellite imagery. Based on a Dvorak classification of T4.0/, the JTWC upgraded Percy into a typhoon on the evening of June 23, with the JMA subsequently following suit in the morning of June 24.

After moving away from the Caroline Islands, the typhoon began to intensify at a faster clip as an outflow channel to its north opened, even though the eye was initially ragged. Early on the next day, the JTWC estimated that Percy obtained its peak intensity based on the Dvorak estimate of T6.0/ and a clear eye. Overland, the storm weakened  slightly, but remained a typhoon upon entering the South China Sea. Both computer models and the JTWC expected Percy to begin recurvature; however, the subtropical ridge did not weaken as expected and Percy continued west-northwest instead. At 00:00 UTC on June 29, the JMA downgraded Percy to a severe tropical storm, although the JTWC suggested that Percy was still a typhoon at the time. At 06:00 UTC, the JTWC downgraded Percy into a tropical storm, noting that the storm had become less organized. By June 30, both the JTWC and JMA had ceased tracking the system, which had dissipated inland.

Impact
During its formative stages, Percy affected several of the Caroline Islands. The island of Pegelmol was nearly cut in half by the system by storm surge. Taro patches, coconut trees, and other crops were almost completely wiped out. There, widespread flooding was reported due to storm surge, with most roads on the island requiring closure and 30 homes being damaged. Airline services in and out Yap were halted. To the south-southwest of Yap, the island of Ngulu Atoll bore the brunt of the typhoon. Gusts of up to  resulted in the destruction of all crops on the island. Furthermore, seven homes were demolished while many others only lost their roofs. However, there were no fatalities. Meanwhile, radio towers, power lines and television lines were downed as several houses lost their roofs.

Typhoon Percy was the third typhoon of 1990, and second within a week, after Typhoon Ofelia, to threaten the Philippines. In the province of La Union, landslides killed six people. In suburban Quezon City, police reported that a woman fell into a creek and drowned. The Philippine Red Cross indicated that a baby girl drowned and two other individuals were listed as missing in floods in the Ilocos Region. According to the social welfare department, 31,206 people in 6,143 families lost their homes. Overall, damage in the country was light.

The typhoon posed enough of a threat to Hong Kong to warrant a No 1. hurricane signal briefly, but it was dropped within 24 hours. High Island received  of rain during the passage of the storm, the highest in the region,  fell in a 24-hour period. These rains resulted in flooding, especially in the New Territories, where there was slight damage to crops. Two other villages lost power and eleven people had to be evacuated.

In the provinces of Fujian and Guangdong of China, power lines were downed. Farm production was reduced by 400 million catties in Fujian. There, 100,000 trees were damaged along with 1,000 power lines. One person was killed and tens of millions in damage was reported in Zhangzhou. In Dongshan, one individual died and four others suffered injuries. One vessel was sunk and seven more were damaged. One third of the trees there were downed. Damage in Dongshan was estimated at ¥27 million (US$5.7 million). Elsewhere,  of farmland was flooded, including  of rice in Shantou. Ninety-five structures were destroyed and two hundred and one were damaged. Roughly  of a highway was destroyed. Damage totaled ¥49 million (US$10 million). Overall, greater than 6,650 homes were damaged and numerous fishing boats sunk. Sixteen people were killed throughout southeastern China and more than 100 others sustained injuries. Damage was estimated at US$28 million.

See also

Typhoon Kim (1980)

Notes

References

1990 Pacific typhoon season
Typhoons
1990 disasters in the Philippines
Typhoons in the Philippines
1990 disasters in China
Typhoons in China
Typhoons in Hong Kong